Rychwał  is a town in Poland, with 2,367 inhabitants (2004) in Konin County, Greater Poland Voivodship.

References

Cities and towns in Greater Poland Voivodeship
Konin County